The Chinese Rugby Football Association (CRFA) is the rugby union governing body in China. Due to the Olympic strategy of China, CRFA has concerned more of the rugby sevens instead of the 15-men rugby since the beginning of 2000s. CRFA also organises American football events within China.

Teams
China national rugby union team – the men's national rugby union team.
China national rugby sevens team – the men's national rugby sevens team.
China women's national rugby union team – the women's national rugby union team.
China women's national rugby sevens team – the women's national rugby sevens team.

See also
Rugby union in China
Sport in China

External links
Chinese Rugby Football Association
China on irb.com

Rugby union in China
China
Rugby

Sports organizations established in 1996
1996 establishments in China